The Special Assistant to the President (SAP) is the official aide of the President of the Philippines. The holder of the position leads the Office of the Special Assistant to the President (OSAP). The SAP provides general supervision to the Presidential Management Staff.

History

Duterte administration
President Rodrigo Duterte appointed Christopher "Bong" Go, a close personal aide of his prior to his presidency, as the Special Assistant to the President (SAP) upon assuming office as the chief executive of the Philippines in 2016. Duterte issued Executive Order No. 1 tasking the SAP to oversee the Office of the Special Assistant to the President (OSAP) as well as the Office of the Appointments Secretary, and the Presidential Management Staff. Go would resign from his post two years later on October 15, 2018, to pursue a bid to be elected as senator in the 2019 elections, although he remained at duty of his functions as SAP in an unofficial capacity until his replacement was officially declared by President Rodrigo Duterte himself.

On November 9, 2020, Jesus Melchor Quitain took over the Office of the Special Assistant to the President (OSAP) as its Officer in Charge.

Officeholders

References

 
2016 establishments in the Philippines